The Intimate Miss Christy is a 1963 album by June Christy. It was remastered and reissued in 2006 with two bonus songs.

Track listing
 "Spring Is Here" (Richard Rodgers, Lorenz Hart) – 3:02
 "Fly Me to the Moon" (Bart Howard) – 3:14
 "I Fall in Love Too Easily" (Jule Styne, Sammy Cahn) – 2:29
 "Time After Time" (Styne, Cahn) – 2:22
 "The More I See You" (Harry Warren, Mack Gordon) – 3:03
 "Don't Explain" (Billie Holiday, Arthur Herzog Jr.) – 2:37
 "It Never Entered My Mind" (Rodgers, Hart) – 3:30
 "You're Nearer" (Rodgers, Hart) – 2:54
 "Misty" (Erroll Garner, Johnny Burke) – 3:05
 "Suddenly It's Spring" (Jimmy Van Heusen, Burke) – 2:43
 "I Get Along Without You Very Well" (Hoagy Carmichael) – 3:08
 "Ev'ry Time" (Hugh Martin, Ralph Blane) – 3:21

Bonus Tracks (on the 2006 re-release)
 "Sometimes I'm Happy" (Vincent Youmans, Irving Caesar) – 1:35
 "Tommy, Tommy" (Jerry Bock, Sheldon Harnick) – 1:41

Personnel
 June Christy – vocals
 Al Viola – guitar
 Don Bagley – bass
 Bud Shank – flute
 Jonah Jones – trumpet
 Teddy Brannon – piano
 George Foster – drums

References

June Christy albums
1963 albums
Capitol Records albums